La'Myia Janae Good–Bellinger  (born September 27, 1979) is an American singer and actress. Good is best known for her voice work in the blockbuster PlayStation 3 game Killzone 3 as the voice of Jammer and her work with R&B group Isyss. Good has appeared in numerous television shows such as Tall Hopes, Sister, Sister, The Parent 'Hood, Smart Guy, ER, The Parkers and Judging Amy. She has also appeared in films such as The Wood.

Early life
Good was born in Panorama City, California to Tyra Wardlow-Doyle (who worked as her sister's manager into her teens), and Leon Good, an LAPD police officer.  Good is the older sister of actress Meagan Good and older cousin of actor/singer Dijon Talton. Good's sister Meagan has said of their heritage that their maternal grandmother is "Jewish and African. My mother's father was Cherokee and something else. My dad's mother's Puerto Rican and black, and his father was from Barbados."

Career

Isyss and BAD GYRL
In 2001, Good along with LeTecia Harrison, Ardena Clark, and lead singer Quierra Davis-Martin formed the R&B group known as Isyss. As a group, they achieved moderate success in 2002 with their debut album, "The Way We Do", which included the Hot 100 charting singles "Day & Night" featuring rapper Jadakiss and their signature song "Single For The Rest Of My Life". During their career, they performed the theme song to the short lived BET talk show "Oh Drama" and were the spokespersons for "Got 2 B So Smooth" hair care products. They were nominated for two Soul Train Lady of Soul Awards and took home one award. Due to poor album sales, they were later dropped from Arista Records, before they could release a second album. Ardena Clark was later replaced by a new member "Love" shortly before they broke up, due to creative differences. Their only album "The Way We Do" reached # 55 on the Billboard Charts and has sold about 300,000 copies. After leaving the group in 2006, Good and "Love" both became members of the R&B trio known as BAD GYRL, which also eventually disbanded. Following her time with both groups, Good decided to focus on acting.

Personal life
Good married singer Eric Bellinger in January 2015. The couple has two sons: Elysha Bellinger (born March 2015) and Eazy Bellinger (born August 2019).

Discography

 The Way We Do (2002)

Filmography

Film

Television

Video Games

References

External links
La'Myia Good on Myspace

1979 births
Living people
Actresses from Los Angeles
African-American women singers
American people of Cherokee descent
People from Panorama City, Los Angeles
American actresses of Puerto Rican descent
Singers from Los Angeles
Hispanic and Latino American women singers
American video game actresses
American soul singers
American people of Jewish descent
American people of Barbadian descent
Arista Records artists
20th-century American actresses
21st-century American actresses
African-American actresses
American television actresses
American film actresses
American voice actresses
21st-century American singers
21st-century American women singers